UMES can refer to:

 University of Maryland Eastern Shore - in Princess Anne, Maryland, is part of the University System of Maryland. 
 University of Michigan Executive System - a operating system.